Abyss is the fourth album by British heavy metal band Lionsheart, released by Metaledge Records on 24 June 2004.

It was the last Lionsheart album to feature Steve Grimmet on vocals.

Reception

Abyss is often hailed by fans as the rebirth of Lionsheart being their first studio album since 1998's Under Fire. The album received good reviews garnering a 6.5 out of 10 from the All Music Guide and the same from Roadrunner Records Blabbermouth.net.

Reviews

Track listing

Personnel
Lionsheart
 Steve Grimmett — Lead vocals
 Ian Nash — Guitars
 Steve Hales — Drums, background vocals
 Eddie Marsh — Bass

References

2004 albums
Lionsheart albums